Kazuo Takahashi ( Takahashi Kazuo; 2 July 1930 – 8 January 2022) was a Japanese politician.

Life and career
An independent, he served as governor of Yamagata Prefecture from 1993 to 2005. He died on 8 January 2022, at the age of 91.

References

1930 births
2022 deaths
Governors of Yamagata Prefecture